Blackswan (Korean: 블랙스완; stylized as BLACKSWAN) are  a South Korean-based multinational girl group formed by DR Music, with an admission and graduation concept. As of December 2022, the group consists of Fatou, Leia, Gabi, Sriya, and NVee.

They originally debuted under the name Rania (라니아) in 2011 with EP Teddy Riley, the First Expansion In Asia. In December 2016, the group reformed as BP Rania (BP 라니아, acronym of Black Pearl Rania) with only released two EPs Start a Fire and Refresh 7th prior returned to promotion as Rania in 2018 and rebranding as Blackswan in October 2020 with their debut album Goodbye Rania.

Career

Pre-debut and member changes
The group was originally set to debut in mid-2010 as the third generation of Baby V.O.X. However, their record company DR Music decided to rebrand them as a new group named Rania (short for “Regeneration Idol of Asia”) with eight members: Saem (later known as Yina), Lucy (later known as Jooyi), Sarah, Riko, Joy, Di, T-ae, and Xia. T-ae, Riko, and Yina were chosen to star alongside former 2PM member Jay Park in his movie Hype Nation, which caused DR Music to delay the group's debut. At the beginning of 2011, Sarah decided to leave the group and was replaced by Chinese trainee Yijo.

2011–2012: Debut as Rania and member changes

Rania made their debut in April 2011 as an eight-member group consisting of Saem, Jooyi, Riko, Joy, Yijo, Di, T-ae and Xia. After the album's release, Yijo revealed that she had left the group. She did not attend the debut performances due to issues with a work visa. On April 6, Rania performed on KBS' Music Bank, with the EP Teddy Riley, the First Expansion In Asia and its title track "Dr Feel Good", composed by Teddy Riley. The song was originally given to Lady Gaga.  The music video and live performances were controversial in South Korea as some viewers felt that the group's image was too provocative. As a result, Rania was forced to change its choreography and make minor changes to the outfits. After the promotion of "Dr Feel Good", the group returned in June with its first digital single "Masquerade", also composed by Riley. Despite having planned an American debut, the group made no advancements. Shortly afterwards Riley announced that he would have nothing more to do with the group after falling out with their record label, releasing a statement saying:

The group released their second EP, Time to Rock da Show, on November 16, 2011. The music video for its title track, "Pop Pop Pop", written by Brave Brothers, was revealed four days later. On 30 May 2012, Rania performed a new song named "Killer" at the Dream Concert.

In June 2012, Joy announced that she left the group, but DR Music claimed she was on hiatus because her parents' house in Thailand had been affected in the flood that occurred around the time of the release. Joy deleted her official Rania Twitter account soon after, but not before writing a post saying: 

Rania then made a comeback on September 16 with the second digital single "Style", whose music video was revealed on September 20. Jooyi did not appear in the comeback, though DR Music claimed she was still a member of the group.

2013–2014: Just Go, temporary hiatus, and member changes

Rania released the lead single "Just Go" on March 8, 2013, along with their first studio album, also titled Just Go (Goodbye's the New Hello). Riko did not participate in this release. They also announced they would debut in America in summer 2013. Empire Records was to handle the girls' distribution while Fireworks was to handle their American management. Larry Rudolph and Adam Leber, two of Britney Spears' managers, were expected to be Rania's managers throughout their U.S. promotions. Starting May 21, Rania began filming for their MTV reality show Road to Fame in Los Angeles and other cities across the U.S. The show would feature the group's preparations for their U.S. debut and would air for three months. It was also revealed that the album would feature collaborations with both Snoop Dogg and 2 Chainz. However, Rania's American debut was delayed again in June. In the meantime, the group filmed a commercial film for Woongjin Waterpark Play°C  and released a special digital single titled "Up" for fans on July 5; Riko was absent again.

In May 2014, the group signed with Spanish label INGENIOmedia and confirmed they would have a comeback in July with "Acceleration", with a second round of promotions in September, but the material was never finalized, The label also confirmed that they were looking for a new and sixth member to replace Riko, who had been not participating from the group since "Just Go". Following an incident where a staffer at INGENIOmedia leaked Rania's comeback track to a sasaeng fan, the company severed ties with the group, stating they were "taking too long". INGENIOMedia later released a statement saying that they were not looking for a member to replace Riko, apologizing for any confusion, and said that any news on member changes would have to come from Rania's company.

In late 2014, the agency released a statement on Saem's possible departure; fans noticed that she had not participated in all the activities and touring, and deactivated all of her social media accounts as well, which sparked the rumors that she left the group. The agency denied the statement, then on the same day it announced Riko's departure to focus on her university studies:

After her departure, it was also announced that Sharon Park would be added to the group.

2015–2016: Return with Demonstrate, member changes, and reformation as BP Rania
In January 2015, fans noticed that Jooyi had not made any public appearances with the group, to which DR Music replied that she was on hiatus. Soon afterwards Sharon announced that she had left the group to focus on her modeling career.

In July of that year, the group made an appearance with two new members, Seulji and Hyeme. In October, they were announced to be making a comeback as a six-member group on November 6 with their third EP Demonstrate. On November 3, Seulji and Hyeme were officially revealed as new members and it was announced that Demonstrate would feature African-American rapper Alexandra Reid, who is the first black woman to be an official member of a South Korean girl group. On November 4, DR Music confirmed that Reid would be joining the group, and confirmed Saem and Jooyi's departures.

DR Music sent out a letter to fans announcing their Makestar project, informing them that Rania's comeback had been pushed back to August 2016 and that they were working on a Hyeme and Alex sub-unit instead. However, on July 13, 2016, Makestar announced that due to repeated failed attempts to contact DR Music about the project's progress and "the continued irresponsible behavior and stance taken by the Rania project creator, and [their] unwillingness to ignore the inconvenience this [was] causing to the project participants", the project was terminated and all money returned to the fans.

On May 26, it was revealed that the last three original members of the group (Di, T-ae and Xia) chose not to renew their contracts and left the group for a new label, Enter Hama. They announced their plans to redebut as "Ela8te", though these plans fell through.

On June 26, Rania performed at a Chinese event with three DR Music trainees: Jian, Jieun (a former member of LPG), and Crystal. On August 15, 2016, Alex announced that she was the group's new leader. On October 25, they performed with two DR Music trainees (Ttabo and Hyeonji) at the 2016 Seoul ICARUS Drone International Film Festival. Two days later, DR Music stated that they would choose new Rania members out of the seven DR Music trainees. On December 23, 2016, DR Music revealed a teaser image for "BP Rania" ("Black Pearl" Rania, in reference to Alex's darker skin tone) and hinted a comeback as a seven-member group. On December 24, an image teaser for Hyeme and new member Jieun were revealed. On 25 December, Zi.U (formerly known as Seulji) and new member Yumin's teaser images were revealed. On December 26, DR Music revealed teaser images for Alex and new Chinese member Ttabo. It was reported that former member Saem rejoined the group two years after her departure in late 2014, and changed her stage name to Yina. On December 27, DR Music revealed the last teaser image for Saem, confirming that she had re-joined the group. The single "Start a Fire" was released on December 30, 2016, along with their fourth EP of the same name. DR Music said "Through Spanish company INGENIOmedia, the song will be available in more than 60 countries around the world."

2017: Refresh 7th and member changes

On February 10, 2017, DR Music announced that BP Rania would start promotions for their second song "Make Me Ah" from the Start a Fire EP, on February 14. It was also announced that this would be the first time that Alex would take part in the entire choreography.

On February 21, DR Music revealed that they were approached by a "well established production company" with an acting opportunity for Alex, to which they responded by releasing a statement saying that they hoped that fans could understand the benefits of this opportunity, and that the opportunity would "allow the group to gain exposure and help BP Rania's success by expanding their fan base." DR Music assured the fans that Alex would remain a fully active member of BP Rania, and would return to her regular schedules after she returned to Korea. Around the same time INGENIOMedia announced that on February 28, they were opening preorders for BP Rania's first compilation album Rania Legends, comprising songs from "Dr Feel Good" to "Start a Fire", with the requirement that 100 preorders be made before they began manufacturing the albums. As well, they stated that all money raised would be dedicated to the production of a mini documentary titled "20 Days With BP RaNia", with any leftover money invested in the production of BP RaNia's next release. The release was eventually cancelled and pre-orders refunded, but INGENIOmedia said that all songs would be re-recorded by BP RaNia and included as a bonus CD and DVD in their next release instead.

On May 12, DR Music announced that they were looking for three to four new members to start BP Rania W, a worldwide group that would promote alongside the current members of BP Rania. At the end of March, Yina revealed that she had left the group again, and the agency later confirmed her departure from the group to focus on acting.

BP Rania continued as a six-member group, releasing their fifth EP Refresh 7th on August 12, with title track "Beep Beep Beep". Promotions became controversial when fans and viewers noticed that Alex had few lines and spent the majority of the performance standing to the side while the remaining five members continued to dance and sing. When fans asked the company to clarify, the choreographer responded "[Alex] said she won't do it because she's a rapper", to which Alex replied via Twitter "If these lies keep magically surfacing, I'll go ahead and come out with the truth. Let it really hit the fan." DR Music then issued a statement saying "The rumors that Alexandra was not willing, able, or present at practice to participate in the full choreography are false. Her level of talent is surpassed only by her work ethic and dedication to the team. It is for those reasons that we gave her the position of leader."

Soon afterwards it was announced that Alex had left the group.

On September 13, it was announced that the group would be making a comeback with "Breathe Heavy" from their Refresh 7th EP.

2018–2019: Forthcoming comeback as Rania, hiatus, and member changes
In January 2018, DR Music issued a statement stating Ttabo was filming a movie in China, after fans noticed that she had missed several appearances with the group. On May 31, DR Music announced Yumin's departure from the group due to her having "recently been faced with circumstances that make it increasingly hard for her to follow the extremely demanding team schedule". It was also announced that the group would make a comeback in June and release a "Best Of" album in August, but neither event occurred. Soon afterwards it was announced that Yumin and former Topp Dogg member P-Goon had married and were expecting a child; the pair has since divorced.

On June 28, it was announced that a new member named Namfon had joined the group, making her the group's second Thai member. She made her first appearance on Rania's Malaysia tour.

On November 7, when asked via SNS by fans if she was still a member, Ttabo stated that she was an “ex-celebrity”. Shortly afterwards, fans noticed that every remaining member of the group had removed "Rania" from their social media accounts and that the company had unfollowed some of the members, leading to rumors that DR Music as a company had gone bankrupt and defunct and the group had unofficially disbanded.

On August 18, 2019, Rania announced via their official Instagram account that they would be performing in Romania from September 4–5 with three new members, although the names and faces of the three were not announced yet. Fans began speculating that this meant Zi.U and Jieun had left the group. On August 28, the group's official YouTube account uploaded a video promoting its Romanian performance as well as revealing the three new members as Seunghyun, Larissa, and ex-Stellar member Youngheun, as well as confirming the departures of Jieun, Zi.U and Ttabo.

2020–2021: Re-debut as Blackswan, Goodbye Rania and Close to Me

On January 25, 2020, Namfon was announced to have left Rania.

On June 26, 2020, Hyeme announced through DR Music's social media pages that the Rania members at that time (except Seunghyun) would rebrand as B.S (later Blackswan).

On July 7, 2020, the group was appointed as ambassadors of Pyeongchang-gun, alongside K-TIGERS ZERO, to promote the county. In the same time, two newest member were revealed: Judy and Fatou.

During a Channel A news broadcast, Blackswan participated in a news story on how the COVID-19 pandemic was affecting the K-pop industry, and revealed that their debut had been postponed indefinitely. On October 9, 2020, Blackswan's social media pages announced that they'd be making their debut with the full album Goodbye Rania on October 16, 2020. The lead single was titled "Tonight".

On November 9, 2020, Hyeme was involved in a scandal in which it was revealed that she'd allegedly scammed a friend out of 50 million KRW (approximately US$44,800). On November 10, DR Music announced Hyeme would leave Blackswan due to the expiration of her five-year contract. They also announced that, due to the aforementioned controversy, Blackswan would be going on a brief hiatus.

On March 6, 2021, Blackswan was revealed to have started a Korean Travel Series in collaboration with the Korean Cultural Center of Belgium.

On October 14, 2021, Blackswan released their first single album Close to Me.

2022–present: Cygnus project 
On January 28, 2022, DR Music unveiled two trainees, Sriya Lenka from India, and Gabi Dalcin from Brazil, stating that only one of them would be joining Blackswan as the group's official fifth member. On May 26, DR Music introduced Sriya and Gabi as a new member of the group through the label's Cygnus project, which an admission and graduation concept.

On July 31, 2022, DR Music announced that the graduation of Youngheun and Judy from Blackswan. On August 19, Fatou mentioned that the group was preparing to release new material during an interview with Teen Vogue.

On November 9, it was announced that Leia would be going on hiatus for health related reasons while the group would move forward with their next comeback.

On December 24, Blackswan released a Christmas pictorial video, where they revealed a new member named Alena Smith who will go by stagename NVee.

Members

Current members
Fatou (파투) (2020–present) - Leader
NVee (엔비) (2022–present)
Leia (레아 ; previously known as Larissa) (2019–present)
Gabi (가비) (2022–present)
Sriya (스레야) (2022–present)

Former members
Rania & BP Rania
Yijo (이조) (2011)
Joy (조이) (2011–2012)
Riko (리코) (2011–2013)
Sharon (2014)
Jooyi (주이) (2011–2015)
Di (디) (2011–2016)
T-ae (티애) (2011–2016)
Xia (시아) (2011–2016)
Yina (이나), previously known as Saem (샘) (2011–2014, 2016–2017)
Alexandra (알렉산드라) (2015–2017)
Yumin (유민) (2016–2018)
Ttabo (따보) (2016–2018)
Zi.U (지유), previously known as Seulji (슬지) (2015–2019)
Jieun (지은) (2015–2019)
Namfon (남폰) (2018–2020)
Seunghyun (승현) (2019–2020)
Hyeme (혜미) (2015–2020)
Youngheun (영흔) (2019–2020)
Larissa (라리사) (2019–2020)
BLACKSWAN
Hyeme (혜미) (2020)
Youngheun (영흔) (2020–2022)
Judy (주디) (2020–2022)

Member Timeline
Timeline Rania and BP Rania

Timeline Blackswan

Discography

Studio albums

Extended plays

Single albums

Singles

Videography

Music videos

References

External links

Official fancafe

K-pop music groups
South Korean dance music groups
South Korean girl groups
2011 establishments in South Korea
Musical groups from Seoul
Musical quartets
Musical groups established in 2011